Zemetchinsky District is an administrative and municipal district (raion), one of the twenty-seven in Penza Oblast, Russia. It is located in the northwest of the oblast. Its administrative center is the urban locality (a work settlement) of Zemetchino. Population: 24,674 (2010 Census);  The population of Zemetchino accounts for 43.7% of the district's total population.

References

Notes

Sources

Districts of Penza Oblast